Ángel Martín Correa (born 9 March 1995) is an Argentine professional footballer who plays as a forward and winger for La Liga club Atlético Madrid and the Argentina national team.

Correa began his professional career at the age of 18 with Argentine club San Lorenzo, winning the Torneo Inicial in 2013 and the Copa Libertadores in 2014. In 2015, he signed with Atlético Madrid of La Liga.

Correa captained the Argentina under-20 team to victory at the 2015 South American U-20 Championship, where he was named the player of the tournament. Since 2015, he has been a regular selection for the Argentina senior squad, and represented the side at the 2021 Copa América and the 2022 FIFA World Cup, with whom he won both tournaments.

Club career

San Lorenzo
Born in Rosario, Santa Fe Province, Correa joined San Lorenzo's youth setup in 2007, aged 12, after a trial period. In the summer of 2012, he was due to join Portuguese club Benfica on a free transfer, but the deal later collapsed.

Correa signed a four-year professional deal with the Ciclón on 23 September 2012, and was promoted to the first-team in January 2013. On 31 March he played his first match as a professional, coming on as a second-half substitute in a 0–1 loss at Newell's Old Boys.

On 11 May, Correa scored his first professional goal, netting the last of a 3–0 home success against Boca Juniors. He finished the campaign with 13 appearances (eight starts, 747 minutes of action), scoring four goals.

Atlético Madrid

On 27 May 2014, after scoring six goals in 2013–14, Correa had agreed a deal with La Liga holders Atlético Madrid for a reported fee of €7.5 million. He signed a five-year contract with the Madrid side, joining the club after the 2014 Copa Libertadores.

In June 2014, however, Correa was sidelined for six months due to a heart tumour. After undergoing surgery on 18 June in New York, he started a light training in August, and officially joined the club on 13 December.

On 22 August 2015, Correa finally made his Atleti debut, replacing Óliver Torres in a 1–0 home league match win against Las Palmas. He scored his first goal for the club on 19 September, netting the first in a 2–0 away win against Eibar; he also assisted Fernando Torres in the second goal.

On 6 November 2019, Correa marked his 200th appearance for Atlético, starting in a 1–2 away loss against Bayer Leverkusen. On 10 August, Atlético announced that Correa and teammate Šime Vrsaljko were both positive for COVID-19, ruling them out of the team's quarter-final fixture against RB Leipzig.

On 22 May 2021, Correa scored in Atlético's 2–1 win over Real Valladolid on the final day of the 2020–21 La Liga season to win the league title for the first time since 2014.

Correa started his 2021–22 La Liga season on the right foot, as he scored in consecutive matches against Celta Vigo and Elche to hand Atlético back-to-back wins.

International career

South American U-20 Championship selection
On 6 January 2015, Humberto Grondona, Under-20 Argentina Selection Technical Director, submitted a list of 32 Argentine players including Correa, invited to train to make the final roster for the South American Under-20s Championship. After four days of training Grondona announced the final 23-man roster that featured Correa as the captain of the Under-20 Argentine side.

On 14 January, Correa made his debut for Argentina U20 national football team against Ecuador in the first game of the group stage. He scored a goal and twice assisted to Giovanni Simeone for a 5–2 win.

On 18 January, Correa scored a goal during a 6–2 win against Peru, helping Argentina advance out of the group stage.

On 26 January, Argentina once again facing Peru in the playoff elimination stage of the tournament, Correa scored again during this matchup, helping Argentina advance to the final with a 2–0 win.

On 7 February, Argentina played against tournament host Uruguay in the U-20 South America Cup final. Throughout the game was a stalemate at 1–1, until Correa scored at the 81st minute to put Argentina up for 2–1 win for the U-20 South America Championship, and Correa earning honors for the Best Player of the Tournament.

U-20 World Cup selection
On 13 May 2015, Humberto Grondona confirmed the list of 21 football players including Correa to represent Argentina in the U-20 World Cup hosted by New Zealand. On 25 May, in the team's second last friendly before the U-20 World Cup competition, Correa scored a header from a corner set for a 3–1 loss against Tahiti.

On 30 May, during Argentina's opening match for the U-20 World Cup group stage against Panama, Correa scored both goals for Argentina for a 2–2 draw. Argentina only earned two points in the group stage meaning they failed to advance into the knockout round.

Senior team

On 4 September 2015, Correa made his full squad debut, coming on as a late substitute for Ezequiel Lavezzi in a friendly match against Bolivia, which ended in 7-0 victory. He scored the last goal of the match.

Correa was a member of the 2021 Copa América winning side, appearing twice in group stage matches against Bolivia and Paraguay.

On 17 November 2022, he received a late call up to the 2022 FIFA World Cup squad, as an emergency replacement for the injured Nicolás González.

Style of play
Correa has been compared to compatriot Sergio Agüero, due to his similar height. However, his playing style is more similar to Carlos Tevez, in a more attacking positional role. He holds good skill, pace and low centre of gravity, aside from a good technique and first touch.

Career statistics

Club

International

Scores and results list Argentina's goal tally first.

Honours
San Lorenzo
Argentine Primera División: 2013 Inicial
Copa Libertadores: 2014

Atlético Madrid
La Liga: 2020–21
UEFA Europa League: 2017–18
UEFA Super Cup: 2018
UEFA Champions League runner-up: 2015–16

Argentina U20
South American U-20 Championship: 2015

Argentina
FIFA World Cup: 2022
Copa América: 2021
CONMEBOL–UEFA Cup of Champions: 2022

Individual
La Liga Player of the Month: January 2022

References

External links

 Profile at the Atlético Madrid website
 
 
 Ángel Correa at ESPN Deportes 
 
 
 
 

1995 births
Living people
Footballers from Rosario, Santa Fe
Argentine footballers
Association football forwards
Argentine Primera División players
San Lorenzo de Almagro footballers
La Liga players
Atlético Madrid footballers
2015 South American Youth Football Championship players
Argentina under-20 international footballers
Argentina international footballers
Argentine expatriate footballers
Argentine expatriate sportspeople in Spain
Expatriate footballers in Spain
Footballers at the 2016 Summer Olympics
Olympic footballers of Argentina
2021 Copa América players
2022 FIFA World Cup players
Copa América-winning players
Copa Libertadores-winning players
FIFA World Cup-winning players